Albania competed at the inaugural 7 sports 2018 European Championships from 2 to 12 August 2018. It competed in 2 sports.

Aquatics

Swimming
A total of 5 swimmers (4 men and 1 woman) represented Albania in the swimming events.
Men

Women

Athletics

A total of 3 athletes (2 men and 1 woman) represented Albania in the athletics events.

 Men 
 Track and road

Field events

 Women 
 Track and road

References

External links
 European Championships official site 

2018
Nations at the 2018 European Championships
2018 in Albanian sport